Chrysopsyche mirifica is a moth of the family Lasiocampidae first described by Arthur Gardiner Butler in 1878. It is found in Angola, Sierra Leone, Cameroon and Nigeria.

Biology
Food-plants of this species are Alchornea cordifolia, Eucalyptus species, Neoboutonia species, Quisqualis indica and Rosa species.

References

External links

Lasiocampinae
Moths of Africa
Insects of West Africa
Insects of Angola